Cadillac Girls is a 1993 Canadian drama film directed by Nicholas Kendall and starring Jennifer Dale, Mia Kirshner, Adam Beach, and Gregory Harrison.

Plot
Sally (Jennifer Dale) is a college professor and single mother in San Francisco who moves with her troubled and delinquent daughter Page (Mia Kirshner) back to her hometown of Ingonish, Nova Scotia after her father's death. Page takes quite favourably to smalltown life and begins dating Will (Adam Beach), while Sally begins a new relationship with poet Sam (Gregory Harrison), but all of their new happiness leaves Sally struggling to decide what to do when she is offered her dream job with Harvard University.

Awards
At the 14th Genie Awards, musician and composer Simon Kendall won the award for Best Original Score for his work on the film.

References

External links

Cadillac Girls at Library and Archives Canada

1993 films
1993 drama films
Canadian drama films
English-language Canadian films
Films shot in Nova Scotia
National Film Board of Canada films
1990s English-language films
1990s Canadian films